Amphipoea is a genus of moths of the family Noctuidae.

Species
 Amphipoea americana Speyer, 1875
 Amphipoea asiatica (Burrows, 1911)
 Amphipoea aslanbeki Ronkay & Herczig, 1991
 Amphipoea bifurcata Gyulai & Ronkay, 1994
 Amphipoea burrowsi (Chapman, 1912)
 Amphipoea butleri (Leech, 1900)
 Amphipoea chovdica Gyulai, 1989
 Amphipoea cottlei (McDunnough, 1948)
 Amphipoea crinanensis (Burrows, 1908)
 Amphipoea cuneata Gyulai & Ronkay, 1998
 Amphipoea distincta (Warren, 1911)
 Amphipoea erepta (Grote, 1881)
 Amphipoea fucosa – saltern ear moth (Freyer, 1830)
 Amphipoea interoceanica (Smith, 1899)
 Amphipoea keiferi (Benjamin, 1935)
 Amphipoea lucens (Freyer, 1845)
 Amphipoea lunata (Smith, 1891)
 Amphipoea malaisei (Nordström, 1931)
 Amphipoea maryamae Zahiri & Fibiger, 2006
 Amphipoea ochreola (Staudinger, 1882)
 Amphipoea oculea (Linnaeus, 1761)
 Amphipoea pacifica (Smith, 1899)
 Amphipoea rufibrunnea (Heydemann, 1942)
 Amphipoea senilis (Smith, 1892) (syn: Amphipoea flavostigma (Barnes & Benjamin, 1924))
 Amphipoea szabokyi Gyulai & Ronkay, 1990
 Amphipoea ussuriensis (Petersen, 1914)

Former species
 Amphipoea velata is now Loscopia velata (Walker, 1865)

References
 Amphipoea at Markku Savela's Lepidoptera and Some Other Life Forms
 Natural History Museum Lepidoptera genus database
 Zahiri, R. & Fibiger, M. (2006) Zootaxa 1244: 33-39

Acronictinae
Noctuoidea genera